The Algerian Popular Movement is a social democratic Berber political party in Algeria. The party, which had been previously known since 2003 as the Union for Democracy and the Republic (UDR, Union pour la Démocratie et la République), was re-founded in February 2012. In the 17 May 2012 People's National Assembly elections, the party won 2.17% of the vote and 7 of the 389 seats.

References

2012 establishments in Algeria
Political parties established in 2012
Political parties in Algeria
Social democratic parties in Africa
Socialist parties in Algeria